The Main Commission of Speedway Sport is governs the sport of motorcycle speedway on behalf of the Polish Motor Union (PZM). The members are appointed by the PZM. The current chairperson of the council is Piotr Szymański.

Members 2007-2011 
 Piotr Szymański - Chairperson 
 Stanisław Bazela
 Dariusz Cieślak
 Ryszard Głód
 Włodzimierz Kowalski
 Maciej Polny
 Piotr Trąbski

See also 
motorcycle speedway
Speedway in Poland

External links 
 Main Commission of Speedway Sport webside
 Reports of Main Commission in Polish

Speedway in Poland
Motorcycle racing organizations